Durio pinangianus is a species of tree in the family Malvaceae. It is endemic to Peninsular Malaysia.

See also
 List of Durio species, with a few notes on this species

References

pinangianus
Endemic flora of Peninsular Malaysia
Trees of Peninsular Malaysia
Vulnerable flora of Asia
Taxonomy articles created by Polbot
Taxa named by Odoardo Beccari